Euxoa aberrans is a moth of the family Noctuidae. It is found from British Columbia, Alberta, Saskatchewan and Manitoba in Canada. In the United States it has been recorded from Washington and Montana.

References 

Euxoa
Moths of North America
Moths described in 1932
Taxa named by James Halliday McDunnough